Alfred Dörffel (24 January 1821 – 22 January 1905) was a German pianist, music publisher and librarian.

Career 

Dörffel was born in Waldenburg, Saxony, the son of August Friedrich Dörffel and his wife Christiane Charlotte, née Kröhne. He received his first musical training by the Waldenburg organist Johann Adolf Trube. He later studied in Leipzig with Gottfried Wilhelm Fink, Felix Mendelssohn and Robert Schumann.

Dörffel was editor for Breitkopf & Härtel and Edition Peters. In 1881, Dörffler wrote the review of 100 years Gewandhaus for the centenary of the concert hall, including a statistic of the concerts during this period.

The Universität Leipzig awarded him an honorary doctorate in 1885. Gustav Flügel dedicated his , Op. 38 (1856, Leipzig, Merseburger) to Dörffel.

He was married to Charlotte Louise Benigna, née Trabert, they had several children. He died in Leipzig.

References

External links 

 
 
 
 Bach Bibliographie / Dörffel, Alfred bw.edu

19th-century German pianists
German music publishers (people)
German Freemasons
German librarians
1821 births
1905 deaths